

Canberra Raiders Cup (First Grade) 
The 2021 Canberra Raiders Cup will be the 23rd season of the cup, the top division Rugby League club competition in Canberra. The 2021 Canberra Raiders Cup will consist of 18 regular season rounds that will begin on the 10th of April and end on the 28th of August. There will be 3 playoff rounds, beginning on the 4th of September with the first semi-final, and ending on the 19th of September with the grand final. Canberra Raiders U20s are the defending premiers.

On 31 August, the Canberra Region Rugby League announced the cancellation of the remainder of the 2021 season due to the Covid-19 Pandemic.

Teams 
There will be 9 teams playing in 2021. 5 teams from Canberra, 2 from Queanbeyan, 1 from Yass, and 1 from Goulburn.

Ladder

Ladder progression 

 Numbers highlighted in green indicate that the team finished the round inside the top 4.
 Numbers highlighted in blue indicates the team finished first on the ladder in that round.
 Numbers highlighted in red indicates the team finished last place on the ladder in that round.
Underlined numbers indicate that the team had a bye during that round.

Season results

Round 1

Round 2

Round 3

Round 4

Round 5

Round 6

Round 7

Round 8

Round 9

Round 10

Round 11

Round 12

Round 13

Round 14

Round 15

Round 16

Round 17

Round 18

Finals series

George Tooke Shield (Second Division) 
There will be 10 teams playing in 2021. 3 teams from Canberra. 7 teams from New South Wales towns surrounding Canberra.

Ladder

Ladder progression 

 Numbers highlighted in green indicate that the team finished the round inside the top 5.
 Numbers highlighted in blue indicates the team finished first on the ladder in that round.
 Numbers highlighted in red indicates the team finished last place on the ladder in that round.
Underlined numbers indicate that the team had a bye during that round.

Season results

Round 1

Round 2

Round 3

Round 4

Round 5

Round 6

Round 7

Round 8

Round 9

Round 10

Round 11

Round 12

Round 13

Round 14

Round 15

Finals series

Reserve Grade

Teams

Ladder

Ladder progression 
 Numbers highlighted in green indicate that the team finished the round inside the top 4.
 Numbers highlighted in blue indicates the team finished first on the ladder in that round.
 Numbers highlighted in red indicates the team finished last place on the ladder in that round.
Underlined numbers indicate that the team had a bye during that round.

Season results

Round 1

Round 2

Round 3

Round 4

Round 5

Round 6

Round 7

Round 8

Round 9

Round 10

Round 11

Round 12

Round 13

Round 14

Round 15

Round 16

Round 17

Round 18

Finals series

Under 19s

Teams

Ladder

Ladder progression 

Numbers highlighted in green indicate that the team finished the round inside the top 4.
 Numbers highlighted in blue indicates the team finished first on the ladder in that round.
 Numbers highlighted in red indicates the team finished last place on the ladder in that round.

Season results

Round 1

Round 2

Round 3

Round 4

Round 5

Round 6

Round 7

Round 8

Round 9

Round 10

Round 11

Round 12

Round 13

Round 14

Round 15

Finals series

Katrina Fanning Shield (Open Women's Tackle)

Teams

Ladder

Ladder progression 

Numbers highlighted in green indicate that the team finished the round inside the top 4.
 Numbers highlighted in blue indicates the team finished first on the ladder in that round.
 Numbers highlighted in red indicates the team finished last place on the ladder in that round.
Underlined numbers indicate that the team had a bye during that round.

Season results

Round 1

Round 2

Round 3

Round 4

Round 5

Round 6

Round 7

Round 8

Round 9

Round 10

Round 11

Round 12

Round 13

Round 14

Round 15

Round 16

Round 17

Finals series

Ladies League Tag

Teams

Ladder

Ladder progression 
 Numbers highlighted in green indicate that the team finished the round inside the top 4.
 Numbers highlighted in blue indicates the team finished first on the ladder in that round.
 Numbers highlighted in red indicates the team finished last place on the ladder in that round.
Underlined numbers indicate that the team had a bye during that round.

Season results

Round 1

Round 2

Round 3

Round 4

Round 5

Round 6

Round 7

Round 8

Round 9

Round 10

Round 11

Round 12

Round 13

Round 14

Round 15

Round 16

Round 17

Round 18

Finals series

Ladies League Tag Second Division

Teams

Ladder

Ladder progression 
 Numbers highlighted in green indicate that the team finished the round inside the top 5.
 Numbers highlighted in blue indicates the team finished first on the ladder in that round.
 Numbers highlighted in red indicates the team finished last place on the ladder in that round.

Season results

Round 1

Round 2

Round 3

Round 4

Round 5

Round 6

Round 7

Round 8

Round 9

Round 10

Round 11

Round 12

Round 13

Round 14

Round 15

Finals series

References 

Canberra Raiders